Vallonia enniensis is a species of minute land snail, a terrestrial pulmonate gastropod mollusk or micromollusk in the family Valloniidae.

Distribution 
The distribution of this species is central-European and southern-European.

It is found in Austria, Belgium, the Czech Republic, France, Germany, Greece, Hungary, Italy, Poland, Romania, Russia, Slovakia, Spain, Switzerland, and the Ukraine.

References 

 Bank, R. A.; Neubert, E. (2017). Checklist of the land and freshwater Gastropoda of Europe. Last update: July 16th, 2017
 Kerney, M.P., Cameron, R.A.D. & Jungbluth, J-H. (1983). Die Landschnecken Nord- und Mitteleuropas. Ein Bestimmungsbuch für Biologen und Naturfreunde, 384 pp., 24 plates. [Summer or later]. Hamburg / Berlin (Paul Parey).
 Sysoev, A. V. & Schileyko, A. A. (2009). Land snails and slugs of Russia and adjacent countries. Sofia/Moskva (Pensoft). 312 pp., 142 plates. 
 Gittenberger, E. (1989). Once more on the range of Vallonia enniensis. Journal of Conchology. 33 (3): 185-186.

External links
 Gredler, V. M. (1856). Tirols Land- und Süßwasser-Conchylien I. Die Landconchylien. Verhandlungen der Kaiserlich-königlichen Zoologisch-botanischen Gesellschaft in Wien. 6: 25–162.

Valloniidae
Gastropods described in 1856
Molluscs of Europe
Taxonomy articles created by Polbot